Sir Isaac James Pitman (known as James), KBE (14 August 1901 – 1 September 1985) was a distinguished publisher, senior civil servant, prominent educationalist, and leading politician, whose lifetime pursuit was the study of etymology, orthography, and pedagogy. His crowning achievement in life was an attempt to better the literacy of children in the English speaking world through using an interim teaching orthography, known as the initial teaching alphabet or i.t.a.  He was honoured with a knighthood in 1961 for his life accomplishments.

James Pitman followed in the footsteps of his famous grand-father, Isaac Pitman, by exploring and expanding the pedagogical theories on teaching children to read the English language. Pitman obsessively studied English etymology, alphabets and orthography. He then presented the argument that the over-arching cause of reading difficulty in children was the phonetic irregularity of the English language. He compiled and published his analysis in his major work, Alphabets and Reading (1965).

Pitman postulated that if children were taught using an interim orthography consisting of an alphabet and spelling system which were phonetically regular, then they would learn to read quickly and easily and so purge the problem of poor literacy which plagued the English speaking world.  He relentlessly exploited his position as a leading politician, and prominent educationalist along with the resources and connections from his successful global printing and publishing business to develop and launch the initial teaching alphabet (i.t.a.), which was initially a spectacular success with its use expanding to 4,000 schools in the UK and 17,000 schools worldwide.

Early life 

Isaac James Pitman was born in Kensington, London, on the 14th of August 1901. His father was Ernest Pitman and his mother was Frances Isabel Pitman, nee Butler. He was the eldest child in the family and had five other siblings, but three were killed in the Second World War:

 Christian Ernest Pitman, born 28 Nov 1902
 Major John Pitman, born 22 Jan 1907 (killed in military action in Palestine, during World War II)
 Captain Peter Pitman Butler, born 05 Mar 1911 (killed in military action in Egypt, during World War II) 
 First Officer Honor Isabel Pitman, born 30 Oct 1912 (killed while piloting an Airspeed Oxford for the Air Transport Auxiliary in 1943, during World War II).
 Diana O. Pitman, born 1914
Pitman's grandfather was the famous Isaac Pitman who had developed Shorthand Writing known as Pitman Shorthand, consequently Isaac James Pitman went by his middle name 'James' to differentiate himself from his grandfather.  The innovations made by his grandfather were monetized into the successful family business, Sir Isaac Pitman and Sons Ltd. As a direct result, James Pitman was born into a wealthy family and received a privileged upbringing, being educated at the elite Summer Fields School, Eton College and Christ Church, Oxford where he graduated with a Master of Arts (MA) in Modern History.

Personal life 

In 1927, Pitman married into the British nobility when he wed the Hon. Margaret Beaufort Lawson Johnston, aka 'Beau' who was the daughter of George Lawson Johnston, 1st Baron Luke and Hon. Edith Laura St. John, they had four children together: -

 Peter John Pitman, born 1928
 David Christian Pitman, born 1936
 Margaret Miller nee Pitman, born 1940
 Michael Ian Pitman, born 194?

Sports 

Pitman was a natural sportsman and excelled in athletics (running), skiing and boxing in which he won the Public Schools middleweight boxing championship of 1919.

Despite this, Pitman's principal sporting passion was rugby union where he played as a running Wing Three-Quarters. Pitman gained his 'blue' at the Oxford University Rugby Football Club (RFC) in 1921, but his main playing career was for Bath Rugby Football Club (RFC) in 61 appearances between 1919 and 1928, he was captain between 1927 & 1928.  Pitman later became President of the Bath RFC from 1952 & 1954. His career culminated in his selection to play for the England rugby union team against Scotland in the Calcutta Cup, played on 18 March 1922, but he only ever earned that single international cap.

Military service 

During World War II Pitman served as a Squadron Leader in the Royal Air Force Volunteer Reserve under Service Number (79438)

 23 May 1940;- granted a commission for the duration of hostilities as Pilot Officer on probation
 21st Dec. 1940;- granted the war substantive rank of Flying Officer on probation
 23 May 1941;- confirmed in his appointment as Flying Officer 
It was during the war years that Pitman tragically lost three of his five siblings.

Corporate career 
He joined his father Ernest Pitman and his uncle Alfred Pitman in the family business originally set-up with his grandfather Sir Isaac Pitman.  In circa 1932, he became the chairman and managing director of Sir Isaac Pitman & Sons Ltd.  Under his stewardship, the business became one of the world's leading educational publishers and training businesses with offices in London, Bath, New York City, Melbourne, Johannesburg, Toronto and Tokyo. The publishing business re-incorporated to Pitman Limited in 1975 then went public in 1983 before being purchased by rival Pearson Plc in 1985. The training business evolved into two separate businesses: Pitman Training Group and JHP Training (which re-branded to Learndirect).

Pitman also served on the board of directors of several large publicly limited companies including Boots the Chemists, Glaxo, Bovril and Equity & Law Life Assurance Society

Educationalist 

Pitman became a prominent British educationalist, promoting education from kindergarten children to adult training.

His association with education started in the 1920s, when Pitman served for a time as headmaster of one of the colleges in Maida Vale under the ownership of his family's business interests (Isaac Pitman & Sons Ltd).

Over his career, Pitman became one of the most prominent persons in the British educational establishment through the mid 20th century, attaining leadership positions in many eminent educational institutes: -

 Chairman, Royal Society of Teachers
 Chairman of Council, National Centre for Cued Speech (for the deaf child)
 Vice-President of the British and Foreign School Society
 Member of the British Association for Commercial and Industrial Education (including the National Association for the Advancement of Education for Commerce)
 Chairman of the Joint Examining Board (between 1935–1950) 
 Chairman, Treasurer & committee member of the Simplified Spelling Society
 Chairman of Council, the Initial Teaching Alphabet Foundation
 Life President of the UK Federation of i.t.a. Schools 
 President of the Society of Commercial Teachers (between 1951–1955)
 Chairman of the management committee of the University of London, Institute of Education 
 Pro-chancellor of the University of Bath between 1972-1981, as a result the Pitman papers reside with the university. The university awarded him an Honorary Degree (Doctor of Letters) in 1970.
Despite the plethora of esteemed positions attained or accolades received, whenever Pitman described himself, such as in his Who's Who listing, he would always place highly his rank & file membership of the National Union of Teachers, this exposed his progressive conservative tendencies over educational matters.

Public service 

Pitman had an extensive career as a public servant: 

 1933-1939; - Pitman serves as the Bursar of the Duke of York's and King's Camp  
1941-1945; - Pitman served as a Director of the Bank of England during the war years 
 1943-1945; - Pitman served as the first Director of Organization and Methods, a senior civil service post at HM Treasury
 1965-1969; - Pitman served as Vice-President of the Institute of Administrative Management
As director of the Bank of England during the war, Pitman was on the board in 1946 which oversaw the nationalisation of the Bank of England by the new Labour administration.  During the war, the Board also had to address the Nazi attempt to financially de-stabilise the United Kingdom through the injection into the British economy of  bank-notes forged at the Sachsenhausen concentration camp, this often overlooked episode in Second World War history was dramatized in the BBC comedy,  Private Schulz.

Member of Parliament 
At the 1945 general election, Pitman was elected to the House of Commons of the Parliament of the United Kingdom as Conservative Member of Parliament (MP) for the Borough of Bath, he was subsequently re-elected four times: - 1950, 1951, 1955, 1959 before finally retiring from Parliament just before the 1964 general election. As a member of parliament, he championed many notable causes:-

Nationalisation 
Pitman was first elected as a Conservative M.P. in the 1945 Labour party landslide win, after which he was involved in the opposition to the nationalisation programme of Clement Attlee's government. In particular, he debated extensively on the nationalisation of the Bank of England and the Gas Board, and wrote the influential pamphlet "Management efficiency in nationalized undertakings", in which he impartially analysed the issues of consumer rights and efficiency in the different models of nationalised industries tried by the Labour government.

Education 
Pitman consistently used his position to petition for improvements to education and training and the funding thereof. As an example, his last contribution as an MP in 1964 was a written question asking for assurances against over-crowding in schools.

Pitman passionately argued in Parliament to make it easier for kindergarten-aged children to learn to read and write through orthographical and spelling reforms to the English Language. Pitman worked with the similarly minded Labour MP, Mont Follick, to table a series of private members bills to enable the reforms. The parliamentary support for these measures forced the government to allow a trial which led to the launch of the Initial Teaching Alphabet.

World Security 
During Pitman's near two decade service as a M.P., there was a large number of wars and coup d'états in various unstable regions of the world including the British Commonwealth, in response ten parliamentarians including Pitman published a paper calling for a World Security Authority which would be a force to impose judgements from a world court to rule over cases of violation of international law.

Honours 

In 1961, Pitman was honoured by being appointed as an Ordinary Knights Commander of the Civil Division of the said Most Excellent Order of the British Empire (KBE)

Orthography & Reading 
Pitman's main life achievement was in endeavouring to make reading & writing easier for kindergarten children and so improving literacy levels in the general population.

Grandfather's Legacy 

Initially, Pitman inherited the ideas formulated by his grandfather, Isaac Pitman, who was a lifelong advocate of spelling reform for the English language and passed this advocacy on to James Pitman. Isaac's major work on spelling reform was the development of the alternative English orthography known as Phonotypy which he published in 1844. Isaac's interest in orthography also led to his development of the most successful form of phonetic shorthand which was known as Pitman shorthand, this eventually became the great source of wealth in the family and led to the formation of Sir Isaac Pitman & Sons, established 1886.

Alphabets & Reading 
Consequently, Pitman obsessively studied the etymology of English orthography.  He bemoaned the post-war government statistics showing that 30% of fifteen year-old who had passed through school education could barely read, and he demonstrated that the irregularity of English phonology was the primary cause of the poor levels of literacy in the English speaking world. In 1969, he published his findings in Alphabets & Reading which was a collaboration with John Robert St. John, a professional writer.

Simplified Spelling Society 
In May 1936, Pitman was elected to the committee of the Simplified Spelling Society after a fortuitous meeting on-board a steam-ship in the mid Atlantic between Pitman and committee member, Professor Lloyd James, Professor of Phonetics at the School of Oriental and African Studies, London University. Pitman re-invigorated the society by bringing both enthusiasm from his grandfather's phonetic legacy and the resources of Pitman and Sons. The first item of business was the publication of the seminal book "New Spelling" which Professor Lloyd James considered as 'One of the most remarkable statistical investigations into English spelling ever undertaken.', the publication costs were funded by Pitman.  Pitman would become treasurer of the Society and was eventually elevated to the President in 1936.

Parliamentary Pressure 
In 1949 and 1953, as a member of parliament he used his position to agitate for orthographic reform through backing private members bills.  Pitman was part of a parliamentary group led by the Labour MP Dr, Mont Follick, who argued that orthographic reform to the English language was needed to improve levels of literacy and to make it easier for young children to learn to read and write.  They succeeded in extracting compromises from the education minister, Florence Horsbrugh, to allow a trial of an orthographic means of teaching children to read.

Initial Teaching Alphabet 
Pitman then went on to the crowning achievement of his life, to develop the initial teaching alphabet (i.t.a.), which was first published in 1959 as The Ehrhardt Augmented (40-sound, 42-character) Lower Case Roman Alphabet. It was designed with the sole purpose of simplifying the task of learning to read English. Pitman had to exploit the resources of his printing & publishing businesses and his extensive connections with the educational establishment to make his remarkable accomplishment.

The trial was wildly successful and the use of the i.t.a. spread unchecked through the UK and onwards to the English speaking world including the USA, Canada, Australia and New Zealand.  By 1968, the i.t.a. federation of schools calculated 4,000 schools in the U.K. and 17,000 schools worldwide used the i.t.a.  During this time, It was heavily studied by researchers and eventually the UK government asked Professor Frank Warburton & Vera Southgate to carryout an independent assessment of all the research, which they published in 1969.  As an example of the positive outcome, Southgate polled 90 teachers on their preference for i.t.a. or traditional orthography (t.o.), and only two teachers preferred t.o. and one had come straight out of teacher training college to teach using i.t.a. so had never experienced the difficulty of teaching children conventionally.  Unfortunately, due to the technological limitations of the time, printed i.t.a. books were expensive and teachers trained in using the i.t.a. were in short supply consequently the i.t.a. gradually became economically unviable and mainly fell into disuse in the 1980s despite its advantages.

George Bernard Shaw and the Shavian Alphabet 

Another proponent of orthographic reform of the age was George Bernard Shaw who on his death in 1950 bequeathed a considerable portion of his estate, a sum of £8,300 towards the promotion of alphabetic reform.  Sir James Pitman, as a leading advocate of such reform, was invited to become a public trustee under Shaw's will, where his duties included the administration and judging of a competition, devised by Shaw, to design an improved, more economical alphabet. This competition was won by Kingsley Read who developed the Shavian alphabet with most of Shaw's legacy spent demonstrating the Shavian alphabet through a special phonetic edition of Androcles and the Lion , published in 1962 by Penguin Books.

References

External links 

 
 

1901 births
1985 deaths
People educated at Eton College
People educated at Summer Fields School
Conservative Party (UK) MPs for English constituencies
Civil servants in HM Treasury
English-language spelling reform advocates
Royal Air Force officers
Royal Air Force personnel of World War II
English rugby union players
Knights Commander of the Order of the British Empire
People associated with the University of Bath
UK MPs 1945–1950
UK MPs 1950–1951
UK MPs 1951–1955
UK MPs 1955–1959
UK MPs 1959–1964
Politics of Bath, Somerset
England international rugby union players
National Union of Teachers-sponsored MPs
20th-century English businesspeople